Andreas Franke (born 18 November 1954) is a German sports shooter. He competed in the mixed 25 metre rapid fire pistol event at the 1980 Summer Olympics.

References

1954 births
Living people
German male sport shooters
Olympic shooters of East Germany
Shooters at the 1980 Summer Olympics